Susan Miller Dorsey High School is a high school located in the Crenshaw District of Los Angeles, California. It is a part of the Los Angeles Unified School District. The school serves Baldwin Hills, Baldwin Village, Jefferson Park, West Adams and a portion of  Leimert Park.

History
The school opened in 1937 and currently enrolls an average of 2,400 students. Dorsey High is now one of the few predominantly African-American high schools in the Los Angeles Unified School District, with 55% of its students African American and 45% Latino. It is located at 3537 Farmdale Avenue and Obama Boulevard near Baldwin Village. The school colors are green and white, and its mascots are the Dons (male) and Donnas (female).

It was in the Los Angeles City High School District until 1961, when it merged into LAUSD.

Namesake
The school was named after Susan Miller Dorsey, the first female superintendent of the Los Angeles public school system. Dorsey was born in 1857 in Penn Yan, New York. She graduated from Vassar College in 1877 and spent a year teaching at Wilson College in Pennsylvania, returning to Vassar to teach Greek and Latin. In 1881, she married Baptist minister Patrick William Dorsey. The same year, the couple came to Los Angeles, where he became pastor of First Baptist Church at 6th Street and Broadway (then known as Fort Street).

In the early 1890s, her husband abandoned her, taking their son with him. Dorsey returned to teaching in 1896 at Los Angeles High School, where she rose to vice principal. By 1913, she was assistant superintendent of schools. In 1920, she became superintendent. Dorsey remained superintendent for 9 years.

Extracurricular activities 
The school has several athletic teams, such as wrestling, football (Coliseum League Champions for the 2006 season), basketball, track & field, soccer, and Tennis (champions: Kenneth Ajeakwa, Valentine Uzoukwu, Moses Egwurube and Robert Troy) 2007–2010.

Rivals
Dorsey's main rival is Crenshaw High School.

Dorsey's football games are played in Jackie Robinson Stadium at the nearby Rancho Cienega Sports Complex. In 2006, Dorsey was the 2nd leading high school in the nation with sending student athletes to the NFL. Dillard High School in Fort Lauderdale, FL was 1st. Dorsey is also a 4-A champ in its conference, the most wins ever made in the Los Angeles history.

Dorsey High School California Academic Decathlon teams won Los Angeles City Super Quiz championships in 1981, 1982, 1984, and 1985.

Additionally, Dorsey High School has a Math Science Magnet Program, a Los Angeles Police Academy Magnet Program and a Law and Public Service Magnet Program. In 1989, the Dorsey High School Mock Trial Team earned 2nd Place in Los Angeles County and was the best team in the City of Los Angeles in the Constitutional Rights Foundation's Annual Mock Trial Competition. In 1990, the Dorsey High School Mock Trial Team won the Los Angeles County Championship and later competed in the State Mock Trial competition in Sacramento.

Football
Dorsey High School's football teams were Los Angeles City Football Champions in 1982,1989, 1991, 1995, and 2001. Susan Miller Dorsey has the distinction of sending the second most football players to the NFL in its entire history behind Long Beach Poly.

Basketball
In 1975, Dorsey's basketball team went undefeated until losing the Los Angeles city championship game to Fremont (whom they had beaten in two regular season games). They rebounded in 1976 to win the city championship over Crenshaw High School.

Notable alumni

Franklin Ajaye (Class of 1967), stand up comedian-actor 
Billy Anderson, NFL player
George "Sparky" Anderson (Class of Winter 1953), Major League Baseball Hall of Fame member, manager of World Champion Detroit Tigers and World Champion Cincinnati Reds, second baseman with the Philadelphia Phillies and broadcaster of the Anaheim Angels
James "Jimmy" Bridges, actor, director, producer
Judge Joe Brown, judge and TV personality
Kenji Brown, guitarist & vocals with Rose Royce, 1976–1979
Keith Browner Jr. (Class of 2006), NFL defensive end
Beno Bryant, football player
Don Buford (Class of 1955), professional baseball player (Chicago White Sox, Baltimore Orioles) and coach
Charles Bukowski, author
John Casado, graphic designer 
Antonio Chatman (Class of 1997), NFL wide receiver
Billy Consolo, professional baseball player (Boston Red Sox, Washington Senators, Minnesota Twins, Los Angeles Angels, Philadelphia Phillies, Kansas City Athletics) and Detroit Tigers bench coach
Aaron Cox, American football wide receiver
Chili Davis, professional baseball player (San Francisco Giants, California Angels, Minnesota Twins, Kansas City Royals, New York Yankees) and Oakland Athletics
Na'il Diggs (Class of 1996), NFL linebacker
Julian Dixon, member of United States Congress
Eric Dolphy (Class of 1947), jazz musician who influenced John Coltrane and many others
Carl Douglas, Trial Lawyer (OJ Simpson)
Johnny Echols, guitarist and co-founder, with Dorsey schoolmate Arthur Lee, of the band Love
Johnathan Franklin (Class of 2008), NFL running back
Siedah Garrett (attended), vocalist and songwriter
Kyle Gibson (born 1987), basketball player for Hapoel Galil Elyon of the Israeli Basketball Premier League
Chris Green, professional baseball player (Pittsburgh Pirates)
Jordan Hamilton (born 1990), basketball player in the Israel Basketball Premier League
Earl Ofari Hutchinson, journalist, author and activist
Robert Irwin, installation artist
Hue Jackson, head coach of the Cleveland Browns in 2016 and the Oakland Raiders in 2011, offensive coordinator of Cincinnati Bengals
Greg Jein, modelmaker nominated for the Academy Award for Best Visual Effects and Primetime Emmy Award for Outstanding Special Visual Effects
Jeremiah Johnson (Class of 2005), NFL running back
Jerome Johnson (Class of 2003), NFL fullback; city champs 2001-2002
Keyshawn Johnson (Class of 1991), USC wide receiver, Rose Bowl Hall of Fame, NFL Super Bowl Champion 1996-2007
Michael "Butch" McColly Johnson, wide receiver for the Dallas Cowboys (1976–1983) and Denver Broncos (1984–1985)
Kendall Jones, lead guitarist, founding member of rock band Fishbone
Robert Kardashian, O.J. Simpson attorney, father of Robert, Khloe, Kourtney and Kim Kardashian 
Marvin Hall (Class of 2011), NFL wide receiver for Detroit Lions and Atlanta Falcons
Marcel Lachemann, professional baseball player (Oakland Athletics) and former MLB manager (California Angels)
Rene Lachemann, professional baseball player (Kansas City Athletics, Oakland Athletics), former MLB manager (Seattle Mariners, Milwaukee Brewers, Florida Marlins)
Arthur Lee, lead singer, co-founder and principal songwriter of the band Love
Mike Love, lead singer and founding member of The Beach Boys
Chris Matthews, 2012 Canadian Football League's Most Outstanding Rookie, Seattle Seahawks wide receiver
Marilyn McCoo, singer and founding member of The Fifth Dimension 
Jaydon Mickens (Class of 2012), NFL wide receiver for the Tampa Bay Buccaneers, Oakland Raiders and Jacksonville Jaguars
Chris Mims, NFL player (San Diego Chargers)
Rahim Moore (Class of 2007), NFL safety
DJ Mustard, record producer, songwriter, DJ
Patrick Nagatani, photographer
Lisa Nichols, motivational speaker, co-contributor to Chicken Soup for the African-American Soul and Chicken Soup for the African-American Women's Soul
Dennis Northcutt (Class of 1996), NFL wide receiver
Paul Olden, New York Yankees public address announcer
Chris "Peanut" Owens, NFL cornerback
Judy Pace, ’70s actress
Ed Palmquist, professional baseball player (Los Angeles Dodgers, Minnesota Twins)
Mike Patterson, professional baseball player (Oakland Athletics, New York Yankees)
Carole Doyle Peel, artist
Billy Preston, musician, singer, songwriter ("You Are So Beautiful")
"Freeway" Rick Ross, drug trafficker in the 1980s, played for the Dorsey men's tennis team
Stella Rush, LGBT rights activist and journalist
Michael Brian Schiffer, co-founder of behavioral archaeology, long-time anthropology professor at the University of Arizona, author of 15 books
Edell Shepherd (Class of 1998), NFL wide receiver, Tampa Bay Buccaneers
Louil Silas Jr. (1956–2001), record executive who started an MCA Records imprint, Silas Records
John Smith, actor, Laramie
Brenda Sykes (Class of 1967), actress 
Dick Teague, industrial designer in automotive industry, executive at American Motors Corporation (AMC).
 Kayvon Thibodeaux, American football player
Derrel Thomas, professional baseball player (Houston Astros, San Diego Padres, San Francisco Giants, Los Angeles Dodgers, Montreal Expos, California Angels, Philadelphia Phillies)
Diane Watson, member of United States Congress
Lamont Warren, NFL running back
David Axelrod, American composer, arranger, and producer
Ralph B White, Titanic explorer and cinematographer,
Jordan Simmons, NFL offensive tackle, Seattle Seahawks
Kirby Wilson, NFL running backs coach, 2-time Super Bowl champion with Tampa Bay Buccaneers (2002) and Pittsburgh Steelers (2009)
Jody Watley (Class of 1977),  singer, with Shalamar, solo artist
James Wilkes, UCLA and Chicago Bulls basketball player
William Boyett, born in 1927, actor best known for TV law enforcement series such as Adam-12 and Highway Patrol

References

External links

 Dorsey High School website
 Dorsey High Alumni Social Network
 Max Preps Athletic Site

High schools in Los Angeles
Los Angeles Unified School District schools
Public high schools in California
Baldwin Hills, Los Angeles
Crenshaw, Los Angeles
South Los Angeles
Educational institutions established in 1937
1937 establishments in California